The Greens is an oppositional political party in Benin. It was part of the Star Alliance which contested the 1999 and 2003 parliamentary elections. At the Beninese parliamentary election in 2003, the Star Alliance won 3 out of 83 seats.

In 2011, the Greens were said to have had 500 members. However, the party had no elected members in the National Assembly or in the 77 local councils in the country.

See also

Conservation movement
Environmental movement
Green party
Green politics
List of environmental organizations

References

1990s establishments in Benin
Global Greens member parties
Green parties in Africa
Political parties established in the 1990s
Political parties in Benin
Political parties with year of establishment missing